Dieter Löhr (born 15 December 1936) is a German fencer. He represented the United Team of Germany at the 1960 Summer Olympics in the team sabre event.

References

External links
 

1936 births
Living people
German male fencers
Olympic fencers of the United Team of Germany
Fencers at the 1960 Summer Olympics
Sportspeople from Leverkusen